Balsam apple  may refer to:
 Clusia rosea, a tree species found in America
 Momordica balsamina, a vine species found in Africa
 Momordica charantia (bitter melon), a vine grown for its bitter and edible fruit
 Echinocystis lobata (wild cucumber)
 Balsam apple, the common name for species of gourds in the genus Echinopepon (family Cucurbitaceae)